Jay Farner (born March 24, 1973) is an American businessman and investor. He is the chief executive officer of Detroit-based mortgage-lending companies Quicken Loans, Rocket Mortgage, and Rocket Companies.

Early life and education
Jay graduated with a bachelor's degree in finance from Michigan State University in 1996, where he restarted its business fraternity Delta Sigma Pi. He lives in the Detroit area with his wife, Wendi, and their three children.

Career
After Farner graduated from Michigan State University, he started as a mortgage banker at Quicken Loans Inc., then called Rock Financial, with Dan Gilbert in 1996. In early 1997, Farner first became director of mortgage banking, then vice president of web mortgage banking in May 1998. Rock Financial's online presence drew the attention of Intuit Inc., which bought the firm in 1999 from Gilbert for $336 million before later selling it back to him in 2002 for $130 million. The company grew to provide direct-to-consumer home loans via the internet in all 50 states. Farner then served as Quicken's president and chief marketing officer, spearheading the company's outreach efforts, and was named one of Crain’s Detroit Business’  40 under 40 class in 2011.

In 2014, Farner led what USA Today called a “billion-dollar gamble” in a March Madness bracket challenge with Yahoo Sports, with a potential $1 billion prize offered to the winner. While only $3 million was handed out, the challenge generated billions of online engagements and millions of new leads, which PR Week called a "data generation exercise … like gold dust" and others called it the “best PR move” of the year.

In 2015, Farner and Quicken Loans created Rocket Mortgage, the first fully digital end-to-end consumer mortgage lending operation. Rocket Mortgage would later become the first lender to perform electronic closings. Upon launch, TechCrunch called Rocket the mortgage industry's “iPhone moment” and compared the process to TurboTax.

Quicken Loans’ Rocket Mortgage released an ad at the 2016 Super Bowl with the tagline “Push Button, Get Mortgage,” whereby clients could get a mortgage via their mobile phone. While some critics said the ease of obtaining loans reminded them of the subprime mortgage crisis, Quicken Loans is “one of the few lenders that came through the financial crisis unscathed,” according to The San Francisco Chronicle, as they were never involved in subprime lending.

In 2017, Farner was promoted to CEO of Quicken. That quarter, Quicken Loans originated $25 billion in direct-to-consumer home loans, surpassing Wells Fargo, with $23 billion, as the largest lender in retail home loans in the US. In August 2020, Quicken's parent company, Rocket Companies Inc, was listed on the New York Stock Exchange, selling 100 million shares and raising $1.8 billion on its first trading day.

References

External links 
 Jay Farner at Quicken Loans

Living people
20th-century American businesspeople
21st-century American businesspeople
21st-century American philanthropists
American billionaires
Businesspeople from Detroit
Michigan State University alumni
American technology chief executives
American real estate businesspeople
1973 births